

Tyrhtel (died ) was a medieval Bishop of Hereford.

Tyrhtel was consecrated in 688 and died between 705 and 710.

Notes

Citations

References

External links

700s deaths
Bishops of Hereford
7th-century English bishops
8th-century English bishops
Year of birth unknown
Year of death uncertain